The 22417 / 22418 Varanasi Mahamana Express is a tri-weekly Mahamana Express class train operated by Indian Railways, which runs between the cities of New Delhi & Varanasi via Bareilly, Lucknow, Sultanpur & Jaunpur city.

History

This was the first Mahamana Express train of Indian Railways. 
The train was flagged off by Narendra Modi, the Prime Minister of India on January 22, 2016 from Varanasi Junction through video conferencing. 
It is currently owned & operated by Northern Railway Zone of Indian Railways organization.

Coach composition
LOCO SLR GS GS H1 A1 PC  S1 S2 S3 S4 S5 S6 S7 S8 S9 GS GS SLR
reverse in UP direction/

Schedule

References

See also

 Mahamana Express
 Kashi Vishwanath Express
 Vadodara - Varanasi Mahamana Express
 Bhopal - Khajuraho Mahamana Superfast Express

Passenger trains originating from Varanasi
Transport in Delhi
Rail transport in Delhi
Mahamana Express trains
Memorials to Madan Mohan Malaviya
2016 establishments in India
Railway services introduced in 2016